Natalie Merchant is the sixth studio album by American singer-songwriter Natalie Merchant, released on May 6, 2014 by Nonesuch Records. Her first studio album consisting of all original material since Motherland (2001), it revisits a characteristic theme of Merchant's, of "characters, and women in particular, struggling in a culture where odds are stacked against them".

Critical reception

Upon release, the album received mostly positive reviews from critics. At Metacritic, which assigns a normalized score out of 100 based on reviews from critics, the album received a score of 73, indicating "generally favorable reviews".

Commercial reception
In the United States, the album debuted at  No. 20 on the Billboard 200 albums chart on its first week of release, selling around 12,000 copies in the United States in its first week. It also debuted at No. 2 on Billboard's Folk Albums,  and No. 5 on the Rock Albums chart. As of October 2015, the album has sold 44,000 copies in the US.

Track listing

Personnel 
Credits adapted from CD liner notes.

Musicians
Natalie Merchant – vocals (1-8, 10, 11)
Eddie Allen – flugelhorn (4, 5), trumpet (4, 5)
Kyle Armbrust – viola (6, 11)
Stephen Barber – string arrangement (1, 10), woodwind arrangement (10)
Andrew Barr – drums (3, 8)
Jonathan Dreyden – organ (8)
Steve Elson – clarinet (7), saxophone (7)
Tony Finno – string arrangement (6, 11)
Nadège Foofat – string arrangement (6, 11)
Marc Friedman – bass guitar (3, 8)
Clark Gayton – horn arrangement (4), trombone (4, 5), tuba (4, 5)
Quan Ge – violin (1, 6, 11)
Mark Goldberg – bassoon (10)
Gabriel Gordon – acoustic guitar (1-5, 7, 10), electric guitar (1, 2, 4, 6-8, 10)
Vivek Kamath – viola (1)
Mindy Kaufmann – flute (10)
Lisa Kim – violin (1, 6, 10, 11)
Liz Lim – violin (1, 6, 11)
Joanna Maurer – violin (1, 6, 11)
Jeremy McCoy – double bass (1, 6, 11)
Anthony McGill – clarinet (10)
John Medeski – organ (1, 4), electric keyboard (2)
Elizabeth Mitchell – backing vocals (2, 6)
Kurt Muroki – double bass (6, 11)
Jesse Murphy – bass guitar (1, 2, 4, 6, 7), acoustic bass (5, 10), tuba (10)
John Patitucci – double bass (1)

Shawn Pelton – drums (1, 2, 4-7)
Erik Della Penna – electric guitar (1, 2, 4, 7, 8), lap steel guitar (3, 5), acoustic guitar (10)
Robert Rinehart – viola (1, 6, 10, 11)
Sein Ryu – violin (1, 6, 11)
Uri Sharlin – grand piano (1, 4, 10), Wurlitzer piano (2), accordion (5), electric piano (7), tack piano (10)
Corliss Stafford – vocals (4)
Alan Stepansky – cello (1, 6, 10, 11)
Simi Stone – backing vocals (1, 4)
Tamar-kali – backing vocals (1)
Johanna Warren – backing vocals (1, 2, 6)
Kenny Wollesen – drums (10), percussion (10)
Sharon Yamada – violin (1, 6, 10, 11)
Ru Pie Yeh – cello (6, 11)
Wei Yu – cello (1)

Technical & design
Natalie Merchant – production
Paul Antonell – recording
Elizabeth Bauer – engineering assistance
Bella Blasko – engineering assistance
George Cowan – recording
Kabir Hermon – engineering assistance
John Horne – engineering assistance
F. Ron Miller – package design
Alex Nappi – engineering assistance
Eli Walker – recording, mixing
Dan Winters – photography

Charts

References

2014 albums
Natalie Merchant albums
Nonesuch Records albums